S67 may refer to:

 , a submarine of the Royal Navy
 Nampa Municipal Airport in Canyon County, Idaho, United States
 SIAI S.67, an Italian flying boat fighter
 Sikorsky S-67 Blackhawk, an American helicopter prototype